Poladtuğay (also, Polat-Tagay and Polat-Tugay) is a village and municipality in the Sabirabad Rayon of Azerbaijan.  It has a population of 1,201.

References 

Populated places in Sabirabad District